The 2004 South African motorcycle Grand Prix was the first round of the 2004 MotoGP Championship. It took place on the weekend of 16–18 April 2004 at the Phakisa Freeway. This was the last South African MotoGP round at Phakisa, because the race was not contracted for 2005 and beyond.

MotoGP classification

250 cc classification

125 cc classification

Championship standings after the race (motoGP)

Below are the standings for the top five riders and constructors after round one has concluded.

Riders' Championship standings

Constructors' Championship standings

 Note: Only the top five positions are included for both sets of standings.

References

South African motorcycle Grand Prix
South African
Motorcycle Grand Prix
April 2004 sports events in Africa